"I'm On" is a song by American rapper Trae tha Truth featuring fellow American rappers Wiz Khalifa, Lupe Fiasco, Big Boi, & Wale and American singer Poo Bear, also known as MDMA. "I'm On" originally appeared on Trae's album Street King, only featuring Lupe Fiasco, Big Boi, Wale and MDMA. On February 3, 2012, a remix entitled "I'm On 2.0" was released, replacing the featured artists with British singer Mark Morrison and American rappers Big K.R.I.T., Jadakiss, J. Cole, Kendrick Lamar, B.o.B, Tyga, Gudda Gudda, and Bun B.

Track listing
 Digital single

Music video
A music video of the song was shot by Philly Fly Boy in Houston, Texas.

I'm On 2.0

A remix of the song leaked on the internet on February 3, 2012. The song features an updated but similar instrumentals. It features artists Big K.R.I.T., Mark Morrison, Jadakiss, J. Cole, Kendrick Lamar, B.o.B, Tyga, Gudda Gudda and Bun B. The remix samples the song "Return of the Mack" by Mark Morrison. A video was released in May 2012 for the remix. It featured cameos from many rappers including T.I., Wiz Khalifa, Juelz Santana, Ludacris, Meek Mill, Future, Ace Hood, DJ Drama, Gucci Mane, Shawty Lo, Wale, Paul Wall, Z-Ro, Styles P, Cee-Lo Green, Iggy Azalea, 2 Chainz and many others. The record was cited by media as one of the biggest collaborations ever, and the biggest rap video of 2012. MTV's RapFix announced that the video was MTV's Jam of the Week on the week it was released.

I'm On 3.0
I'm On 3.0 was released on June 23, 2017 and featured T.I., Dave East, Tee Grizzley, Royce Da 5'9", Curren$Y, Dram, Snoop Dogg, Fabolous, Rick Ross, Chamillionaire, G-Eazy, Styles P, E-40, Mark Morrison & Gary Clark Jr. A music video was released in January 2019.

References

2011 singles
2011 songs
Trae tha Truth songs
Wiz Khalifa songs
Lupe Fiasco songs
Wale (rapper) songs
Big Boi songs
Mark Morrison songs
Songs written by Lupe Fiasco
Songs written by Wiz Khalifa
Songs written by Big Boi
Sequel songs

Songs written by Poo Bear
Big K.R.I.T. songs
B.o.B songs
J. Cole songs
Kendrick Lamar songs
Tyga songs
Jadakiss songs
Bun B songs